The Home Bank of Canada was a Canadian bank that was incorporated July 10, 1903 in Toronto. It succeeded the earlier Toronto Savings Bank, which had been founded in 1854 by Bishop Armand-François-Marie de Charbonnel and the local chapter of the Society of St. Vincent de Paul and later Home Savings and Loans in 1871. The failure of Home Bank on August 18, 1923, was the subject of a Canadian Royal Commission initiated by Prime Minister William Lyon Mackenzie King in 1924.

Founded with the support of the Roman Catholic Church, James Mason and Henry Pellatt represented a benign board of directors including E.G. Gooderham, Claude Macdonnell and three other directors from Winnipeg, Manitoba affiliated with the United Grain Growers.

Early controversies
Early in its history a number of questionable loans were advanced, including one to A.C. Frost Company to buy timber rights in British Columbia, and another to the New Orleans Gouther and Grand Isle Railway secured by a rolling stock of dilapidated rail cars. In 1912 it undertook a campaign of expanding into Quebec and eastern Canada, to the chagrin of the western Canadian Directors who were seeing much of the bank's capital unavailable for western loans. At the same time, many of the large loans went unpaid and the accrued interest, through a form of bank fraud, was recapitalized onto the principal of the loans.

William Machaffie, Manager of the Winnipeg Branch and a banker since 1882, told the western directors as early as 1914 that the "cooking of the books" through the adding of unpaid interest to the principal and then calculating the interest as profit to pay dividends to major shareholders and directors was wrong.  Machaffie wanted to tell the minister of finance at the time, Thomas White, but the western directors were not so sure.

The federal government of the day was not prepared to deal with a bank crisis during wartime. After a leave of absence in 1917 Machaffie returned to his desk to find his position was gone.  He wrote a letter to the Minister of Finance which outlined issues regarding bad loans, capitalization of unpaid interest, and accounting malpractice at head office, and stated the only hope for the bank's survival was a merger. He decided not to send the letter to the minister but instead to the Board to "stir things up a bit".  He was fired.  On August 29, 1918, he drafted a new letter and this time sent it to the Minister of Finance outlining his concerns and a litany of delinquent and non-arm's length loans and issues related to serious flaws in the Home Bank's internal auditing process.

Collapse

The post-war period brought prosperity and the inflationary boom gave Home Bank its share of the Canadian penchant for saving money. The bank opened 28 new branches (for a total of 82) between 1921 and 1923.   Though this period, under greater government scrutiny and with the death of Senator James Mason in 1918, the new president of the bank, Herbert Daly was challenged to "keep all the balls in the air at the same time".

On 17 August 1923 the bank's main branch did not open and would remain closed indefinitely. The provincial and federal government appointed a liquidator, Geoffrey Teignmouth Clarkson of Clarkson Gordon to untangle the mess and seek recovery for the thousands of depositors whom had lost millions of dollars in the collapse and to which the Bank no longer had. Clarkson was highly experienced in liquidating banks, having served as liquidator in at least three prior. After thoroughly reviewing the affairs of the bank he wrote that “Never at any time in its career, was an experienced and trained banker at the head of the bank and in control of its affairs. It can be said that the [bank management] utterly failed to pay regard to or impose elementary safeguards in protection of the business of the bank.”

The major chartered banks intervened in 1920 to control rising prices by raising interest rates.  Demand for credit fell and the resulting recession drove prices down dramatically, making assets worth less than the money loaned to acquire them.  During this time, and with the dust storms of the 1922–1923 drought, many farmers lost their land and livelihood.

The indifference of the Eastern banking community led to the success of populist parties in Western Canada and Ontario. In 1922 the United Grain Growers, whose officers comprised the western bank board members, sold all of their shares in the bank.  At the same time the Western Canada Pulp and Paper Company had defaulted and, in the spring of 1923 the bank asked Mackenzie King's government for help, which was refused.  The stock plummeted and depositors withdrew money in ever-swelling streams.  On the August civic-holiday, J. Cooper Mason, son of the founder and a director, retired to his study and committed suicide.

The Canadian National Railway, whose director Richard F. Gough was also a member of the bank's board, withdrew $1 million just before the collapse. The bank closed for good August 17, 1923.  Ten officials from Home Bank were arrested on charges ranging from concurring with false returns to fraud on October 4, 1923 at a time when the bank's assets were estimated at $2.7 million and liabilities at $15.5 million. 60,000 prairie farmers and a substantial portion of Toronto's Catholic community lost their savings.  In the panic that followed the bank's closure, the Ontario Government shored up the Dominion Bank with $1.5 million to stop a deposit run. Herbert Daly, the Home Bank president, was unable to testify after a nervous breakdown and he died on October 22, 1923. However, liquidator GT Clarkson was extensively called to testify to better understand the situation. 

Cabinet secrecy rules protected politicians from any liability in the matter and, in a precedent setting bailout, the federal government agreed to pay $5,450,000 to depositors (deposit insurance was not enacted until 1967 in Canada), providing some settlement to the thousands who lost money as a result of the failure which, had the bank been liquidated or merged in 1916 or 1918 would have been without any loss to depositors.

References

Bibliography

Defunct banks of Canada
Banks established in 1903
1903 establishments in Ontario
Bank failures
Banks disestablished in 1923
1923 disestablishments in Ontario
Companies based in Toronto